Rob Judson (born January 13, 1958) is an American men's basketball coach who is currently an assistant coach at Illinois State. He was the head coach at the Northern Illinois University from 2001 to 2007 and held assistant positions at Bradley, Illinois, and Indiana. He played college basketball at the University of Illinois from 1976 to 1980.

Inducted into the Illinois Basketball Coaches Association's Hall of Fame as a player in 1990.
He is the son of Phil Judson and nephew of All-American basketball player Paul Judson and Major League Baseball player Howie Judson.

Head coaching record

References

1958 births
Living people
American men's basketball players
Bradley Braves men's basketball coaches
College men's basketball head coaches in the United States
High school basketball coaches in Illinois
Illinois Fighting Illini men's basketball coaches
Illinois Fighting Illini men's basketball players
Illinois State Redbirds men's basketball coaches
Indiana Hoosiers men's basketball coaches
Northern Illinois Huskies men's basketball coaches